is an Echizen Railway Mikuni Awara Line railway station located in the city of Fukui, Fukui Prefecture, Japan.

Lines

Station layout
The station consists of two opposed side platforms connected by a level crossing. The station is unattended.

Adjacent stations

History
Nishibetsuin Station was opened on April 1, 1929. On September 1, 1942 the Keifuku Electric Railway merged with Mikuni Awara Electric Railway. Operations were halted from June 25, 2001. The station reopened on August 10, 2003 as an Echizen Railway station.

Surrounding area
The area is primarily residential, with high-rise apartment buildings and homes lining the streets.
The name of the station refers to the nearby Nishi Honganji Temple, Fukui Branch, which has betsuin status.
Other points of interest include:
Japan Self-Defense Force Fukui Provincial Cooperation Office
Fukui Prefecture governmental building (agricultural and tax offices)
Fukuiken Shokuinkaikan
Fukui City Fire Department Naka Fire Station

See also
 List of railway stations in Japan

External links

  

Railway stations in Fukui Prefecture
Railway stations in Japan opened in 1929
Mikuni Awara Line
Fukui (city)